Joonas Henttala (born 17 September 1991) is a Finnish professional racing cyclist, who currently rides for UCI ProTeam .

Major results
2011
 2nd Road race, National Road Championships
2014
 2nd Road race, National Road Championships
2021
 1st  Road race, National Road Championships

References

External links
 

1991 births
Living people
Finnish male cyclists
People from Porvoo
Sportspeople from Uusimaa
People with type 1 diabetes